St. Gallen railway station serves the town St. Gallen, the capital of the canton of St. Gallen in Switzerland. It is located at the junction of the standard gauge St. Gallen–Winterthur, Rorschach–St. Gallen, and Romanshorn–Toggenburg lines of Swiss Federal Railways and the  gauge Appenzell–St. Gallen–Trogen line of Appenzell Railways.

Opened in 1856 and completely rebuilt at the outset of the 20th century, the station is owned and operated by Swiss Federal Railways (SBB CFF FFS), and is the focal point of the St. Gallen S-Bahn. It also serves as a central station to the Appenzell Railways (AB) and many city and urban bus connections in front of the main building.

Layout
St. Gallen railway station is situated in Bahnhofplatz, just to the west of the city centre. The standard gauge portion of the station consists of four platforms (1 island platform and three side platforms) serving 7 tracks ( 1–7). Appenzell Railways serves tracks 11 and 12 at a pair of side platforms in the station forecourt.

Services 
 the following rail services stop at St. Gallen:

 EuroCity: service every two hours between Zürich Hauptbahnhof and München Hauptbahnhof.
 St. Gallen S-Bahn:
 : hourly service over the Bodensee–Toggenburg railway between Nesslau-Neu St. Johann and Altstätten SG
 : hourly service over the Bodensee–Toggenburg railway and Rorschach–St. Gallen railway via Sargans (circular operation).
 : hourly or better service over the St. Gallen–Winterthur railway to Weinfelden and hourly service over the Rorschach–St. Gallen railway to St. Margrethen.
 : rush-hour service over the Appenzell–St. Gallen–Trogen railway between Appenzell and Trogen.
 : half-hourly service over the Appenzell–St. Gallen–Trogen railway between Appenzell and Trogen.
 : hourly service over the Bodensee–Toggenburg railway to Herisau.
 : rush-hour service over the Bodensee–Toggenburg railway to Wittenbach.

See also

History of rail transport in Switzerland
Rail transport in Switzerland

Notes

References

External links
 
 

Railway stations in the canton of St. Gallen
Buildings and structures in St. Gallen (city)
Swiss Federal Railways stations
Railway stations in Switzerland opened in 1856